Darrell Waltrip Motorsports was a NASCAR team owned by three-time Winston Cup champion Darrell Waltrip.  It was formed in 1991 when Waltrip resigned from Hendrick Motorsports to start his own team, and was originally named DarWal, Inc.. During the 1970s, Waltrip, like many drivers of the time, formed their own teams for racing, in lower levels, originally DarWal, Inc, was his personal licensing agent and operator for many short-track cars he would race at many circuits on non-Cup weekends or special events, and eventually went to Busch Series racing.  In 1991, the racing team moved up to the Cup level, with Hendrick support, but he divested himself of Busch operations at the end of the 1993 season. Sold the Busch team to Hank Parker Sr Racing in 1994.

Waltrip has also run part-time with his team, with his final NASCAR Truck Series race coming at Martinsville Speedway, where he finished 12th.

NASCAR Winston Cup 

DWM debuted at the 1991 Daytona 500 as car No. 17 with sponsorship from Western Auto. (The car number and numbering style were a carryover from Waltrip's days as a driver for Hendrick Motorsports.)  Waltrip led at one point during the event, but finished 24th following an accident late in the race. Waltrip won five races over the next two years, with his final top-10 points finish coming in 1994. After that, the pressure of being an owner/driver started to crash down on Waltrip, and his performance declined. After Western Auto was renamed to Parts America, they planned on leaving the team, but stayed on for another year before leaving after 1997. That same year, Waltrip failed to qualify for his first race in 23 years since the 1974 Winston 500 at the fall race at Charlotte Motor Speedway. In addition, DWM briefly expanded to two cars, when Rich Bickle finished 34th at that year's Brickyard 400 the No. 26 Kentucky Fried Chicken Chevy also fielded by DWM, as well as Waltrip running special paint schemes to commemorate his 25th year in the sport.

After almost losing his team due to a lack of sponsorship, Waltrip signed Speedblock/Builders Square to sponsor his car in 1998, but they did not live up to most of their obligations as a sponsor, and Waltrip cancelled the contract. Waltrip's last race as owner/driver came at the spring Darlington race that year, driving the Tim Flock Special, a special paint scheme to honor the NASCAR legend who would lose his battle with cancer later that month. After that, Waltrip sold the team to Tim Beverly. The team was so disorganized Beverly temporarily suspended operations to get everything situated. The team returned later in the year as the No. 35 Tabasco Pontiac with Waltrip driving after the team merged with the defunct ISM Racing. Waltrip left at the end of the year after not posting a top-ten finish. This team ran as Tyler Jet Motorsports for the next two seasons.

In 2007, Darrell Waltrip admitted that he failed as an owner-driver because he thought more like a driver and not like an owner.

Camping World Trucks

In 1996, Waltrip began his own team in the Craftsman Truck Series team, hiring Bill Sedgwick to drive his No. 17 Sears/DieHard Chevy. Sedgwick collected eight top tens and finished 14th in points. In 1997, Rich Bickle drove the truck,  winning three races and finishing second in points. After the season, Bickle resigned as he had hoped to run with Waltrip in the Cup series in 1998. Waltrip was about to run Phil Parsons in the truck, but after Sears pulled out, he shut the team down until 2003.

In 2003, Waltrip fielded his own truck, this time in partnership with brother Michael and HT Motorsports for a pair of Craftsman Truck races at Martinsville Speedway with the No. 17, the first with Tide (with the Tide with Bleach brand, intentionally reminiscent of his 1989 Daytona 500 win), and the second with the Aaron's promotion of The Three Stooges that ran in various series.

DWM became full-time in 2004 as one of the new works Toyota teams.  NTN Bearings sponsored the truck for two seasons, driven by David Reutimann, who won the NASCAR Craftsman Truck Series Rookie of the Year award.  The team expanded to a second team in 2005, purchasing the No. 12 truck piloted by Robert Huffman from Innovative Motorsports. Huffman was replaced during the season by Mike Wallace.

Joey Miller attempted to pilot the No. 12 truck full-time in 2006, but was released late in the season and the team finished with various drivers. Reutimann ended the season third in points and moved up to the NEXTEL Cup and Busch Series to drive for Waltrip's brother Michael Waltrip. The team became co-owned by Darrell and Michael Waltrip but kept the Darrell Waltrip Motorsports banner, as noted on the Waltrip Racing Web site.

As part of changes in 2007 with its move into Michael Waltrip's operations banner, the team became a one-truck team and the number was switched to No. 00 to maintain consistency with the rest of the Michael Waltrip Racing banner, and A. J. Allmendinger drove the No. 00 for a few races to help in his NASCAR experience, with Aaron's as the sponsor, along with Red Bull for a few races early in the season) and Michael Waltrip Racing putting developmental drivers Josh Wise and Ken Butler III in the truck, although Justin Labonte also drove a few races for the team. After one last race with Michael McDowell the team sold off its truck equipment in October 2007 to legendary road racing team The Racer's Group.

See also 
Ginn Racing
Michael Waltrip Racing

External links
 

1991 establishments in North Carolina
American auto racing teams
Darrell Waltrip
Defunct companies based in North Carolina
Defunct NASCAR teams